The Long Play is the debut studio album by German singer Sandra, released on 11 November 1985 by Virgin Records. The album was a great commercial success and spawned Sandra's signature number-one single "(I'll Never Be) Maria Magdalena" as well as the international top-five single "In the Heat of the Night".

Singles
The lead single "(I'll Never Be) Maria Magdalena" was released in March 1985 and went on to top the charts in 21 countries worldwide. It spent 16 weeks in the German top 20, remaining Sandra's only chart-topper in her home country, and is now considered her signature song.

"In the Heat of the Night" was chosen as the follow-up single to "Maria Magdalena" in late 1985. The song charted within the top five in a number of European countries, later earning Sandra second place at the Tokyo Music Festival in 1986. The single version would only become available on CD on The Platinum Collection in 2009.

The third and final commercial single taken from The Long Play was "Little Girl", released in early 1986. The song's music video was filmed entirely on location in Venice, Italy. "Little Girl" met with modest success in international music market.

"Sisters and Brothers" was released in 1988 as a promotional single in Japan only. The song, dedicated to Sandra's brother Gaston, is a cover version of Michael Cretu's song "Zeitlose Reise" from his 1983 solo album Legionäre.

Track listing

Personnel
Credits adapted from the liner notes of The Long Play.

 Sandra – lead vocals
 Michael Cretu – digital and conventional keyboards, drum computers, background vocals, arrangement, production
 Markus Löhr – guitars
 Hubert Kemmler – background vocals
 Mike Schmidt – cover design
 Dieter Eikelpoth – photography

Charts

Weekly charts

Year-end charts

Certifications

Release history

References

1985 debut albums
Albums produced by Michael Cretu
Sandra (singer) albums
Virgin Records albums